Elizabeth Penrose may refer to:

 Mrs Markham, pseudonym of Elizabeth Penrose (1780–1837), English writer
 Elizabeth Penrose (fashion journalist), editor of British Vogue 1936–1939
 Beth Penrose, a character in Plum Island
 Elizabeth Humphreys Penrose (born 1960), American writer of poetry in the science fiction genre